Syzygy is a three-song EP by the American rock band Lynch Mob released in 1998 just after George Lynch left Dokken for another time; Mick Brown decided to stay with Dokken but did perform on the EP. Syzygy saw the return of original Lynch Mob vocalist Oni Logan, and the departure of Robert Mason. The band broke up again after a single writing session, which resulted in Syzygy.

Track listing

Personnel
 Oni Logan - vocals
 George Lynch - guitar
 Anthony Esposito - bass guitar
 Mick Brown - drums

Additional personnel
 Cover Art - Mike Rehmer
 Mixing, Engineering - Mark Matson

References

Lynch Mob (band) albums
1998 EPs
Elektra Records EPs